Paul Kariuki Njiru (born March 11, 1963) is the Bishop of Embu Diocese in Kenya.

Seminary formation and studies 
Paul Kariuki Njiru was born in Kyeni, Embu. After schooling, he studied at St. Joseph’s seminary and then St. Thomas Aquinas seminary in Nairobi. In 1991 the Pontifical Urban University awarded him a Bachelor’s degree for his studies while in Kenya. He was ordained to the priesthood for the Diocese of Embu on March 1, 1993. As a parish priest, he worked in Kairuri parish and served as diocesan youth chaplain. He was the education secretary for Catholic schools in Embu Diocese. Having studied for six years in Rome, he was then awarded an S.T.L. (1999) and an S.T.D. (2002) in Biblical Theology from the Pontifical Gregorian University.

Bishop of Embu 
Pope Benedict XVI nominated him Bishop of Embu on May 9, 2009. He was ordained on July 25. The consecrating bishops were Archbishop John Kardinal Njue of Nairobi, Peter J. Kairo, Archbishop of Nyeri, and Anthony Muheria, Bishop of Kitui.

He is chairman of the Catholic Health Commission of Kenya, a commission formed by the Kenyan Bishops' Conference. As chairman, he has oversight of the 58 hospitals, 83 health centers, 311 dispensaries, and 17 medical training institutions owned and operated by the Catholic Church in Kenya.

Publications 

 Charisms and the Holy Spirit's Activity in the Body of Christ: An Exegetical-Theological Study of 1 Corinthians 12,4-11 and Romans 12,6-8 [Doctoral dissertation] (Rome: Ed. Pontificia Univ. Gregoriana, 2002).

External links 

 
 Video of Bishop Njiru celebrating Mass

References 

1963 births
Kenyan Roman Catholic bishops
21st-century Roman Catholic bishops in Kenya
21st-century Roman Catholic theologians
Pontifical Gregorian University alumni
Living people